Four figure skating events at the 2006 Winter Olympics were held at the Palavela in Turin.

Lithuanian ice dancers Margarita Drobiazko and Povilas Vanagas (who were married in 2000) became the first figure skaters to compete at five Olympics.

Medal summary

Medalists

Medal table

Entries

Champions Gala
The traditional Figure Skating Champions Gala took place on February 24 at Palavela, featuring exhibition performances by the top five placers in the four figure skating events and all the Italian skaters. Pairs skaters Zhang and Zhang (second in pairs) did not participate in the gala.

The following is a partial list of skaters who appeared in the Champions Gala (in order of skate):

Faiella and Scali (Italian dance team), Karel Zelenka (Italian men skater), Silvia Fontana (Italian ladies skater), Denkova and Staviski (fifth in dance), Joannie Rochette (fifth in ladies), Inoue and John Baldwin (seventh in pairs), Johnny Weir (fifth in men), Delobel and Schoenfelder (fourth in dance), Fumie Suguri (fourth in ladies), Petrova and Tikhonov (fifth in pairs), Evan Lysacek (fourth in men), Grushina and Goncharov (third in dance), Irina Slutskaya (third in ladies), Fusar-Poli and Margaglio (Italian dance team), Carolina Kostner (Italian ladies skater), Pang and Tong (fourth in pairs), Jeffrey Buttle (third in men), Belbin and Agosto (second in dance), Sasha Cohen (second in ladies), Shen and Zhao (third in pairs), Stéphane Lambiel (second in men), Navka and Kostomarov (first in dance), Shizuka Arakawa (first in ladies), Totmianina and Marinin (first in pairs), and Evgeni Plushenko (first in men).

Russian pair Tatiana Totmianina / Maxim Marinin and Evgeni Plushenko skate accompanied by Edvin Marton at the violin, playing from the ice.

At the end of the gala, the skaters all gathered together to close the show with their bows.

Participating NOCs

Thirty-five nations contributed figure skaters to the events at Torino.

References

External links

 

 
2006 Winter Olympics events
2006
2006 in figure skating
O